Trees Field is a facility consisting of athletic fields located at the upper campus of the University of Pittsburgh located in Pittsburgh, Pennsylvania. The facility contained both a baseball and softball fields, which were often individually referred to as "Trees Field", as well as two adjacent artificial turf practice fields.

Prior to the opening of the Petersen Sports Complex in 2010, the baseball and softball stadiums served as the home fields of the university's Panthers college baseball and softball teams and had listed capacities of 500 spectators.  Prior to 1999, Trees Field had undergone greater than $500,000 in renovations that included the installation of an AstroTurf infield, lights, and the two AstroTurf practice fields. Although they still exist, it is planned that baseball and softball fields will serve as the site of a new track and field facility.

The adjacent 1.5 acre athletic field had artificial turf that was lined for two regulation flag football fields installed in 1999. The fields are utilized as multi-purpose areas for intramural sports, club sports, as practice space for the Pitt Band.

References

External links
Venue information

Defunct college baseball venues in the United States
Softball venues in Pittsburgh
Sports venues in Pittsburgh
Pittsburgh Panthers sports venues
Pittsburgh Panthers baseball venues
Baseball venues in Pennsylvania
Pittsburgh Panthers softball venues